The Horse Tamers are a pair of larger-than-life sculptures in Pittsburgh, Pennsylvania, located at the Stanton Avenue entrance to Highland Park. They are copies after the famous Marly Horses (Chevaux de Marly) (marble, 1739-45), by sculptor Guillaume Coustou the Elder, that flank the entrance to the Champs-Élysées in Paris. The Highland Park sculptures were modeled by sculptor Giuseppe Moretti, and installed in 1900.

Each depicts a youth attempting to control a rearing horse. The bronze sculptures are approximately 15 feet (4.57 m) tall, and stand upon granite bases approximately 11 feet (3.35 m) tall. 

The sculptures are on the City of Pittsburgh's list of designated historic landmarks.

References

Outdoor sculptures in Pennsylvania
Equestrian statues in Pennsylvania
1900 sculptures
Bronze sculptures in Pennsylvania